Grindstone Creek is a stream in Boone County in the U.S. state of Missouri. It is a tributary of Hinkson Creek.

Grindstone Creek was named for the deposits of rock along its course which were the source of grindstones. Grindstone Parkway, a major road in Columbia, Missouri, is named after the creek.

See also
List of rivers of Missouri

References

Rivers of Boone County, Missouri
Rivers of Missouri
Geography of Columbia, Missouri